State Road 1 (NM 1) is a state highway in New Mexico, that runs north from Mitchell Point to Socorro.

After an intersection with NM 107, NM 1 passes dirt roads leading to Fort Craig and San Marcial. It then goes through the Bosque del Apache National Wildlife Refuge, as well as the communities of San Antonio, where it intersects U.S. Route 380 (US 380), and Luis Lopez, before ending in Socorro.

Route description
State Road 1 begins at an interchange with Interstate 25, in Mitchell Point. It then quickly turns to parallel I-25, and travels alongside the freeway through barren terrain. The route begins to turn away from I-25 near the Sierra–Socorro county line, and connects to I-25 Exit 100 via a spur.

In Socorro County, State Road 1 continues to parallel I-25, though at a greater distance. NM 1 crosses under the larger highway as they near a rest area, serving I-25 traffic. Shortly thereafter, State Road 1 intersects State Road 107, providing a connection to Magdalena. Past NM 107, NM 1 passes a dirt road, allowing access to the former Fort Craig. The road begins traveling in a more easterly direction, coming close to the Rio Grande. NM 1 intersects another dirt road, which provides access to San Marcial, and passes through the Bosque del Apache National Wildlife Refuge, on the way to San Antonio.

Known as Main Street in San Antonio, State Road 1 intersects U.S. Route 380. NM 1 also goes through Luis Lopez, before crossing under I-25 again, turning again to parallel the successor route. The older road travels north, passing by the Socorro Municipal Airport before ending at I-25 Bus. in Socorro.

History
State Road 1 generally follows the route of El Camino Real de Tierra Adentro, which was a colonial trade route between Mexico City and San Juan Pueblo (present day Ohkay Owingeh). This became the original State Road 1 upon the initial definition of highways.

In the initial plans for the U.S. Highway System, the portion of State Road 1 south of Raton was designated as U.S. Route 466 (US 466; not to be confused with the later, signed route of the same number, now decommissioned). However, by the time the plan was finalized, US 466 had been merged into U.S. Route 85. Also, US 66 ran on the part of State Road 1 from south of Las Vegas to Los Lunas.

In the 1960s, US 85 was almost entirely supplanted by Interstate 25. The U.S. Route 85 designation has since been completely deleted from the NMDOT route logs, (although AASHTO retains the US-85 designation, following I-25 and I-10 through New Mexico to maintain continuity between signed segments in Texas and Colorado). The State Road 1 designation was then resurrected for use on the portion of old US 85 from Truth or Consequences to Socorro.

Major intersections

See also

References

External links

 Details of New Mexico State Routes 1-25

001
001
Transportation in Sierra County, New Mexico
Transportation in Socorro County, New Mexico
U.S. Route 85
Camino Real de Tierra Adentro